At the Hickory House is a two-volume live album by German-born jazz pianist Jutta Hipp featuring performances recorded in 1956 and released on the Blue Note label as BLP 1515 and BLP 1516.

Reception
The Allmusic review by Stephen Thomas Erlewine awarded the albums 4 stars stating "At the Hickory House is a thoroughly appealing collection of lightly swinging small-combo jazz that draws equally from hard bop and soul-jazz".

Track listing
Volume 1
 "Take Me in Your Arms" (Fred Markush) - 4:54 		
 "Dear Old Stockholm" (Traditional) - 4:44 		
 "Billie's Bounce" (Charlie Parker) - 4:06 		
 "I'll Remember April" (Gene de Paul, Patricia Johnston, Don Raye) - 3:52 	
 "Lady Bird" (Tadd Dameron) - 3:52 		
 "Mad About the Boy" (Noël Coward) - 3:47 		
 "Ain't Misbehavin'" (Harry Brooks, Andy Razaf, Fats Waller) - 5:02 	
 "These Foolish Things" (Harry Link, Eric Maschwitz, Jack Strachey) - 3:59 	
 "Jeepers Creepers" (Johnny Mercer, Harry Warren) - 8:46 	
 "The Moon Was Yellow" (Fred E. Ahlert, Edgar Leslie) - 4:54
Volume 2
 "Gone With the Wind" (Herb Magidson, Allie Wrubel) - 4:50
 "After Hours" (Avery Parrish) - 4:40
 "The Squirrel" (Dameron) - 3:46
 "We'll Be Together Again" (Carl Fischer, Frankie Laine) - 3:15
 "Horacio" (Jutta Hipp) - 3:20
 "I Married an Angel" (Lorenz Hart, Richard Rodgers) - 4:24
 "Moonlight in Vermont" (John Blackburn, Karl Suessdorf) - 3:24
 "Star Eyes" (Gene de Paul, Don Raye) - 4:01
 "If I Had You" Irving King, Ted Shapiro) - 3:54
 "My Heart Stood Still (Hart, Rogers) - 4:21
Recorded at the Hickory House in New York City on April 5, 1956

Personnel
Jutta Hipp – piano
Peter Ind – bass
Ed Thigpen – drums

References

1956 live albums
Albums produced by Alfred Lion
Blue Note Records live albums
Jutta Hipp albums